Ducie may refer to:

People
 Earl of Ducie, title in the Peerage of the United Kingdom
 Barons Ducie, see Earl of Ducie
 Sir Robert Ducie, 1st Baronet (1575-c.1634)
 Henry George Francis Reynolds-Moreton, 2nd Earl of Ducie (1802-1853)
 Henry Reynolds-Moreton, 3rd Earl of Ducie (1827-1921)
 David Leslie Moreton, 7th Earl of Ducie (born 1951) 
 Henry Ducie Chads (1788-1868), officer in the British Royal Navy

Places
 Ducie Island, Pitcairn Islands
 Ducie River, Queensland, Australia